Warden Park Secondary Academy is a coeducational secondary school based in Cuckfield (near Haywards Heath), West Sussex, England.

Description
There are approximately 1,500 students at the school, from 11 to 16 years old. The current headteacher is Dom Kenrick, who started in September 2017. The chair of the governing body is Jonathan Ash-Edwards.

The school's 2012 Ofsted report said: "Academic attainment is consistently above average and often high." Its 2015 Ofsted report said: "Staff model respectful behaviour and require high standards."

History

The school opened in September 1956 as Cuckfield County Secondary School and was later renamed Warden Park School. It became an academy in September 2011 and was renamed Warden Park Secondary Academy. It is partnered with Warden Park Primary Academy. Both academies are part of the Sussex Learning Trust.

Notable alumni

Patience Agbabi, poet and spoken-word performer
James Chisholm, professional rugby union player for Harlequins and England Saxons
Ross Chisholm, professional rugby union player for Harlequins
Gwendoline Christie, actress
Dale de Neef, Trinidadian-born Scottish cricketer
Mat Osman, bassist in the band Suede
Richard Osman, television presenter
Steffan Piolet, cricketer for Warwickshire County Cricket Club and Sussex County Cricket Club
Wilbur Soot, YouTuber
James Thorpe, cricketer for Sussex
Chris Warburton, radio presenter
Roy Winters, ex-professional rugby union player for England, Harlequins, Bristol

References

External links

Warden Park website

Mid Sussex District
Academies in West Sussex
Secondary schools in West Sussex